The Reformed Church of East Africa was founded in 1944 when the Dutch Reformed Church in South Africa started mission work in Eldoret Kenya. This work was overtaken by the missionaries came from the Netherlands Reformed Church. The church accepted the Three Forms of Unity. When the Dutch missionaries left, they left behind a Kenyan Reformed church. At the time it has more than 600 congregations and 110,000 members. The denomination has a theological seminary in Eldoret, The Reformed Institute For Theological Training (RITT). RITT offers courses in Theology. The church become autonomous in 1963. There are more than 110,000 adherents. The Christian Reformed Church in Eastern Africa separated in 1992. It is a member of the World Communion of Reformed Churches. It has official relationship with the Christian Reformed Church in North America.

Theology 
Athanasian Creed
Nicene Creed
Canons of Dort
Heidelberg Catechism
Westminster Confession of Faith
Leaders
Current Moderator is Rev David Letting (since 2019). Former Moderators include Rev Joshua Biboko, Rev Hosea Chemweno, Rev Geoffrey Songok and Rev Musa Maina. The current General Secretary is Rev Dr Luka Ariko Ekitala (since 2019). Former General Secreatary include Rev Justine Malkwen Mutai, Rev Henry Cleophas Wanjala, Rev Samson Akoru and Rev Jonah Kipngetich Lagat.
The church is lead by elders from local church.
group of local church make a parish which makes a prebyitary and in turn group of prebitary makes a synod which is the highest office in the church.
synod is headed by church moderator
the church also has departments like men fellowship department,women department,youth department,sunday school department,education department,finance and investment department and people with different abilities department.

References 

Reformed denominations in Africa
Churches in Kenya
Protestantism in Kenya
Members of the World Communion of Reformed Churches
1944 establishments in Kenya